"The Veldt" is a science fiction short story  by American author Ray Bradbury. Originally appearing as "The World the Children Made" in the September 23, 1950, issue of The Saturday Evening Post, it was republished under its current name in the 1951 anthology The Illustrated Man.

In the story, a mother and father struggle with their technologically advanced home taking over their role as parents, and their children becoming uncooperative as a result of their lack of discipline.

Plot 
The Hadley family lives in an automated house called "the Happylife Home", filled with machines that aid them in completing everyday tasks, such as tying their shoes, bathing them, or cooking their food. The two children, Peter and Wendy, enjoy time in the "nursery", a virtual reality room able to realistically reproduce any place they imagine, and grow increasingly attached to it. 

The parents, George and Lydia, begin to wonder if there is something wrong with their way of life. Lydia tells George, "That's just it. I feel like I don't belong here. The house is wife and mother now, and nursemaid. Can I compete with an African veldt? Can I give a bath and scrub the children as efficiently or quickly as the automatic scrub bath can? I cannot". They are perplexed that the nursery is stuck on an African landscape setting, with lions in the distance, eating an unidentifiable animal carcass. There they also find recreations of their personal belongings and hear strangely familiar screams. Wondering why their children are so concerned with this scene of death, they decide to call a psychologist.

The psychologist, David McClean, suggests they turn off the house, move to the country, and learn to be more self-sufficient. Peter and Wendy strongly resist and beg their parents to let them have one last visit to the nursery. They give in and allow the children more time in the nursery. When George and Lydia come to fetch them, the children lock their parents into the nursery with the pride of lions, and the two realize that the screams belonged to simulated versions of themselves. Shortly after, David comes by to look for George and Lydia. He finds the children enjoying lunch in the nursery and sees the lions and vultures eating carcasses in the distance, which are implied to be the parents.

Adaptations

The story was adapted by Ernest Kinoy as an episode  of the radio program Dimension X in 1951.  The same script was used in a 1955 episode of X Minus One, with the addition of a frame story in which it was explained that George and Lydia were not really slain, and that the entire family was now undergoing psychiatric treatment.

An adaptation by Jack Pulman was broadcast on the BBC Light Programme on March 5, 1959, with John Cazabon and Diana Olsson.

"The Veldt" was adapted for the cinema as part of The Illustrated Man (1969).

"The Veldt" was adapted into a stage production by Bradbury and can be found in a volume titled The Wonderful Ice Cream Suit & Other Plays in 1972.

A short film adaptation of "The Veldt" was produced by BFA Educational Media in 1974.

In 1983, Swedish Television premiered a TV movie based on "The Veldt", under the title Savannen ("The Savannah"), with Bibi Andersson in the role of Lydia, and Erland Josephson playing David.

In 1984, Michael McDonough of Brigham Young University produced "The Veldt" as an episode of Bradbury 13, a series of thirteen audio adaptations of famous Ray Bradbury stories, in conjunction with National Public Radio.

In 1987, a film titled The Veldt was made in the USSR (directed by Nazim Tulyakhojaev), where several of Bradbury's stories were intertwined. It was billed as the "First Soviet Horror Movie".

The Canadian-produced anthology television series The Ray Bradbury Theater included the story, scripted by Bradbury, as Episode #29 (Season 3, Episode 11).  It was first broadcast on November 10, 1989, and starred Linda Kelsey, Malcolm Stewart, Shana Alexander, and Thomas Peacocke.

The BBC produced another radio play version of "The Veldt", adapted from the stage play by Mike Walker, in 2007, which was broadcast on BBC Radio 4.

In 2010, Stephen Colbert read "The Veldt" for the NPR radio program Selected Shorts before a live audience at Symphony Space.

In 2012, shortly before author Ray Bradbury's death, Canadian musician deadmau5 produced a song titled "The Veldt", including lyrics by Chris James based upon the story. The music video, released after Bradbury's death, is dedicated to him and shows a young boy and girl wandering through an African veldt and witnessing several plot points from the story including vultures, screams, and a lion eating a carcass implied to be one of the parents due to glasses. The original title of the story, "The World the Children Made", is repeated throughout the chorus of the song.

See also

Holodeck from the "Star Trek" universe
Simulated reality
Simulated reality in fiction

Notes

References

External links
 
 Ray Bradbury's official website

1950 short stories
Science fiction short stories
Short stories by Ray Bradbury
Works originally published in The Saturday Evening Post
Short stories adapted into films
Virtual reality in fiction